Tolkunbek Hudaybergenov (born January 4, 1986) is a Turkmen weightlifter. He was born in the Gurbansoltan Eje district, Daşoguz Region.

Major results

Notes and references

External links
 NBC profile
 Athlete Biography at beijing2008

Turkmenistan male weightlifters
Weightlifters at the 2008 Summer Olympics
Olympic weightlifters of Turkmenistan
1986 births
Living people
People from Daşoguz Region
Weightlifters at the 2006 Asian Games
Weightlifters at the 2010 Asian Games
Asian Games competitors for Turkmenistan
21st-century Turkmenistan people